Scabrina is a genus of operculate land snails, terrestrial gastropod mollusks in the subfamily Cyclophorinae of the family Cyclophoridae.

Species 
Species in the genus Scabrina include:
 Scabrina basisulcata (E. von Martens, 1897)
 Scabrina belang Foon & Marzuki, 2022
 Scabrina brounae (Sykes, 1898)
 Scabrina calyx (Benson, 1856)
 Scabrina fimbriosa (Möllendorff, 1885)
 Scabrina franzhuberi Thach, 2020
 Scabrina hirsuta (Möllendorff, 1884)
 Scabrina hispidula (W. T. Blanford, 1863)
 Scabrina inglisianus (Stoliczka, 1871)
 Scabrina laciniata (Heude, 1885)
 Scabrina laotica Möllendorff, 1897
 Scabrina liratula (Preston, 1909)
 Scabrina locardi (J. Mabille, 1887)
 Scabrina moellendorffi Gredler, 1887
 Scabrina patera (L. Pfeiffer, 1854)
 Scabrina phaenotopicus (Benson, 1851)
 Scabrina pinnulifer (Benson, 1857)
 Scabrina thaitieni Thach, 2021
 Scabrina tonkiniana (J. Mabille, 1887)
 Scabrina vanbuensis (E. A. Smith, 1896)
Species brought into synonymy
 Scabrina microscopica (Morelet, 1881): synonym of Cyclophorus microscopicus Morelet, 1881 (unaccepted combination)
 Scabrina pinnulifera (Benson, 1857): synonym of Scabrina pinnulifer (Benson, 1857) (incorrect subsequent spelling)

References

External links

 Blanford, W. T. (1863). Contributions to Indian malacology. No. IV. Descriptions of new land shells from Ava, and other parts of Burma. The Journal of the Asiatic Society of Bengal. 32 (4): 319-327. Calcutta.
 Mabille J. (1887). Sur quelques mollusques du Tonkin. Bulletins de la Société Malacologique de France. 4: 73-164, pls 1-4
 Kobelt W. (1902). Das Tierreich. Eine Zusammenstellung und Kennzeichnung der rezenten Tierformen. 16. Lieferung. Mollusca. Cyclophoridae. Das Tierreich. XXXIX + 662 pp., 1 map.
 Nevill, G. (1878). Hand List of Mollusca in the Indian Museum, Calcutta. Part I. Gastropoda. Pulmonata and Prosobranchia-Neurobranchia, xv + 338 pp. [> 1 December. Calcutta (Office of the Superintendent of Government Printing)]

 
Gastropod genera